Geoffrey Ian Gallop  (born 27 September 1951) is an Australian academic and former politician who served as the 27th Premier of Western Australia from 2001 to 2006. He is currently a professor and director of the Graduate School of Government at the University of Sydney and former chairman of the Australian Republican Movement.

Born in Geraldton, Western Australia, Gallop studied at the University of Western Australia, and later progressed to St John's College at the University of Oxford after winning a Rhodes Scholarship. Having joined the Labor Party in 1971, he served as a councillor for the City of Fremantle between 1983 and 1986, and was elected to the seat of Victoria Park in the Western Australian Legislative Assembly at the 1986 state election. Having held several portfolios in the preceding Lawrence Ministry (including Minister for Education), Gallop replaced Jim McGinty as Leader of the Opposition in 1996 following McGinty's resignation.

At the 1996 election, Labor was defeated by the incumbent Liberal Party led by Richard Court despite a rise in Labor's share of the vote, but he remained as the party's leader, and at the 2001 election Labor was elected to government, with Gallop becoming premier. Having successfully contested the 2005 election, Gallop resigned as Premier, Labor leader and from parliament in early 2006 to aid his recovery from depression, and was replaced by Alan Carpenter.

Early life, education and pioneer family
Gallop was born and educated in Geraldton. He then entered The University of Western Australia (UWA) in 1969 to study economics. He joined the Labor Party in 1971, and was awarded a Rhodes Scholarship in 1972. In 1974 he studied Philosophy, Politics, and Economics
at St John's College, Oxford where he met and became close friends with Tony Blair.
Blair is the godfather of Gallop's son Tom,
and Gallop was a groomsman at Blair's 1980 wedding.
He is also a long-time friend of former federal Labor Leader Kim Beazley. Gallop subsequently received a doctorate of philosophy (DPhil) from Oxford in 1983.

Before entering state politics, Gallop worked as a tutor and lecturer at both Murdoch University and The University of Western Australia, and was a City Councillor at Fremantle from 1983 to 1986.

Gallop's family was among the first pioneer settlers to the new Swan River Colony now known as Perth in Western Australia. His great-great-grandfather, James Gallop arrived in the Swan River Colony in 1829 the year of the colony's founding. At the age of 18 James, along with two brothers – 20-year-old Richard and 15-year-old Edward – left a Thakeham, West Sussex workhouse. The Gallop brothers left the small village of Thakeham in West Sussex along with several other families from Thakeham and the nearby villages of Sullington and Storrington. Several of these migrants later inter-married: James' son also named James married Emma Woods daughter of George Woods who also came out from Thakeham with his brother John and nephew Jesse Woods.  Edward Gallop later drowned but James and Richard became pioneering market gardeners and vignerons. Two homes, Gallop House and Dalkeith House, are heritage-listed legacies of the family's prominence. The brothers were part of a clearing-out of the parishes in the aftermath of the Napoleonic wars.  As Greenfield wrote "The 1820s were very difficult years for agricultural workers and great poverty prevailed, owing partly to the demobilization of soldiers following the end of the Napoleonic Wars, and partly to the high cost of bread due to the Corn Laws. Sullington seems to have been particularly hard hit. ... Emigration was encouraged throughout West Sussex to relieve the parishes of the burden of excessive poor relief. “ The Gallop brothers were among those who chose Australia instead of America:  "West Australia was still very much in the pioneering stage.  Letters from emigrants to their friends and relations in this neighbourhood give the impression that those who sailed to America, provided they were not afraid to work, had an easier life than those who took the greater risk and went to Australia".

Politics
Gallop was elected to the Western Australian Legislative Assembly for the seat of Victoria Park in 1986.
From 1990 to 1993, during the Lawrence Labor Government, Gallop held portfolios including Education, Parliamentary and Electoral Reform, Fuel and Energy, Micro-Economic Reform, and Minister assisting the Treasurer. The Lawrence government was defeated at the 1993 state elections, and Gallop was elected Deputy Leader of the State Parliamentary Labor Party.

Opposition Leader
In Opposition, his Shadow Ministerial responsibilities included Treasury, Resources and Energy, Parliamentary and Electoral Reform, Public Sector Management, Accountability, Sport and Recreation, Aboriginal Affairs, Health, Federal Affairs, Treasury and the South West.

In October 1996, Jim McGinty resigned as Leader of the Opposition and named Gallop his successor, a role he assumed without a caucus vote.
Soon afterwards, he led Labor into an election held in December. He was heavily defeated by the Liberal Party government of Richard Court, taking only 35.8 percent of the primary vote—its lowest total since 1901.

In government
At the February 2001 state election, Gallop led the Labor Party to victory, taking 13 seats from the Liberals on a seven-percent swing—the largest swing against a sitting government in the state since 1911.

Gallop became Premier and Minister for Public Sector Management, Federal Affairs, Science, Citizenship and Multicultural Interests.
Gallop went on to win a second term at the 26 February 2005 state election.

As premier, Dr Gallop oversaw a range of political and social reforms (electoral reform, gay and lesbian equality and a state Administrative Tribunal), changed the State's industrial and labour laws, brought a spirit of reconciliation to the resolution of native Title and developed partnership models for the State's indigenous communities, changed the law to require all 16- and 17-year-olds to be in education or training, was the first Premier to commit his government to a major desalination plant, stopped the logging of all of the State's Old Growth Forests, creating a record number of new national parks, restructured the State's electricity and racing industries, and started construction of the Perth to Mandurah Railway and the associated City Rail Tunnel.

As Minister for Science he established the Science Council, committed significant funding to Research and Development in the State, and established the Premier's Research Fellowship Program to attract leading researchers from overseas and interstate.

Resignation
On 16 January 2006 Gallop announced he was resigning as premier and retiring from politics to aid his recovery from depression.
He addressed a news conference stating that "in the interests of my health and my family I have decided to rethink my career".
Deputy Premier and Treasurer Eric Ripper took over from Gallop as Acting Premier, pending a leadership vote at the State Labor Caucus.
Alan Carpenter was elected unopposed
and was sworn in on 25 January 2006.

Post-government activities
Gallop became a professor and director of Sydney University's Graduate School of Government in 2006.

From 2007 to 2009 he was a community member of the NSW Health Department's great Metropolitan Clinical Task force.

From 2007 to 2011 he was Deputy Chair of the Council of Australian Government (COAG) Reform Council and in 2008 he was appointed to the National Health and Hospitals Reform Commission which reported to the Commonwealth Government in June 2009.

In 2010, he joined the Advisory Board of the Hawke Research Institute at the University of South Australia and from 2011 has been the Chair of the New Democracy Foundation's Research Committee. He also sits on the Dean's Advisory Group at the University of Sydney Medical School.

In 2011 he was appointed by Australia's Foreign Minister to chair the Australia Awards Board and in the same year was appointed a member of the Commonwealth's International Education Advisory Council.

Since 2010 he has been writing a weekly column for Fairfax Media's online paper WA Today and from 2006 to 2007 was a columnist for the Australian newspaper's Higher Education Supplement.

In 2010, Gallop accepted the role as Chairman of the research committee of The newDemocracy Foundation, a research group, focused on better models of government. Gallop is a patron of the Jhana Grove Meditation Centre and the Buddhist Society of Western Australia, where he received help for depression.

Gallop was elected chairman of the Australian Republic Movement in November 2012, replacing Maj.-Gen. Michael Keating.

In 2019 Gallop was reportedly appointed to the Global Commission on Drug Policy.

Political views
Gallop is a strong supporter of the movement for an Australian republic, and took a leading role in the push for a directly elected president during the 1998 Constitutional Convention in Canberra.
He is pro-choice on the issue of abortion.
Professor Gallop has published three books – one on the English radical Thomas Spence "Pig's Meat – Selected Writings of Thomas Spence", edited with an introductory essay (Spokesman Books Nottingham, 1982), one on Western Australian politics and society "A State of Reform: Essays for a Better Future" (Helm Wood Publishers, Wembley, 1998) and "Politics, Society, Self: Occasional Writing" (UWA Press, Crawley, 2012)

Gallop is an advocate for drug policy reform.

Awards
 In 2001 he was awarded the Centenary Medal and was honoured with Life Membership of the Association for the Blind (Western Australia).
 In 2003 he was elected a Fellow of the Institute of Public Administration Australia, in 2006 he was admitted to the honorary degree of Doctor of Letters from the University of Western Australia.
 In 2008 he was appointed a Companion of the Order of Australia.
 In 2022 he was elected a Fellow of the Academy of the Social Sciences in Australia.

References

External links
 newdemocracy.com.au
 Resignation statement in state government
 Constitutional Centre of Western Australia entry on Geoff Gallop
 

|-

|-

|-

1951 births
Australian people of English descent
Alumni of St John's College, Oxford
Alumni of Nuffield College, Oxford
Australian Labor Party members of the Parliament of Western Australia
Australian republicans
Australian Rhodes Scholars
Companions of the Order of Australia
Delegates to the Australian Constitutional Convention 1998
Australian drug policy reform activists
20th-century Australian politicians
Leaders of the Opposition in Western Australia
Living people
Academic staff of Murdoch University
People from Geraldton
Premiers of Western Australia
University of Western Australia alumni
Academic staff of the University of Western Australia
Members of the Western Australian Legislative Assembly
Academic staff of the University of Sydney
Australian writers
21st-century Australian politicians
People from Thakeham
Western Australian local councillors
Energy Ministers of Western Australia
Fellows of the Academy of the Social Sciences in Australia